The article lists Vietnam's province-level divisions by Gross regional domestic product (GRDP). Each province's GRDP is listed in both the national currency VND, and at nominal U.S. dollar values according to annual average exchange rates and according to purchasing power parity (PPP).

2019

See also 
 List of ASEAN country subdivisions by GDP

References 

GDP
Vietnamese administrative divisions by GDP
GDP
Vietnam, GDP